Oglio Records is an American record company started in 1993 by Carl Caprioglio. The label issues compilations of rare 1980s modern rock and new wave songs, many previously unreleased on CD. In addition to releasing new material by artists such as BigBang, Nerf Herder and Wesley Willis, the label has also re-released albums by artists such as Brian Wilson and Barnes & Barnes. Oglio Entertainment has also released stand-up comedy CDs by the likes of Jackie Martling and George Lopez.

History
The founder of Oglio Records, Carl Caprioglio, has stated that as a youth he was influenced by both the rock playing on Los Angeles radio stations KMET and KLOS and the modern rock of KROQ. He also listened heavily to new wave music. In 1984 he and a friend began to disc jockey at dances and parties in California, eventually forming a DJ business with a variety of other DJs. After he filled in for a friend at a gig with the KROQ DJ, Caprioglio's business began supplying light sound equipment to KROQ, as well as Power 106.

In 1992 Caprioglio released his first compilation album, which was titled Flashback! New Wave Classics. In 1993 he left his DJ business to found Oglio Records, which quickly gained a reputation for compilations of rare 1980s modern rock releases. At the time music reissues on CD were a burgeoning field, and Oglio Records successfully competed with larger labels. The label also began releasing re-issues of complete albums by bands such as King, Sparks, the Red Rockers, and Wire Train. Other compilations included Flashback Cafe (1994), Punk University Vol. 2 (1995), and Straight Outta Cleveland (1995). In 1995 the label released the compilation The Edge of Christmas, which included Christmas songs by Pat Benatar, The Pretenders, David Bowie and Bing Crosby, The Ramones, The Pogues and others. Oglio Records quickly began releasing original albums as well, such as the 1996 album Rock 'N' Roll Will Never Die by Wesley Willis. In 1998 Oglio Entertainment was included by Inc. Magazine as one of the 500 fastest growing companies in America. They have also reissued the catalog for the classic Television's Greatest Hits compilation series.

Overview
Oglio Records is now an imprint of Oglio Entertainment, which is headquartered in Las Vegas, Nevada. Oglio Entertainment has different divisions for comedy, rap, rock, kids, holiday, and video, with Oglio Records handling rock and reissues. The sub-division Glue Factory Records handles alternative rock, and DMAFT Records handles rap and hip-hop. The label continues to be known for preserving and re-issuing new wave music of that late 1970s and early 1980s, especially tracks which had previously been unavailable on CD. It distributes in the United States and Canada through INgrooves. The label also works with Planetworks/MVD.

Artists

Current

Beatallica
Dana Countryman
Andy Dick
Cyndi Lauper
Jamie James
Jean-Jacques Perrey
Dana Countryman
Margo Guryan
MC Lars
Naked Eyes
Nerf Herder
Palmdale
Parry Gripp
Roger Joseph Manning, Jr.
Wisely

Former

20/20
The Arrogant Worms
Big Daddy
Boo-Yaa T.R.I.B.E.
Jackie Martling
The Leftovers
The Motels
The Muffs
The Shocker
Shonen Knife
Wesley Willis

Release history

References

External links
 
 Oglio Records on MySpace
 Oglio Records on YouTube

American independent record labels